Heritage Documentation Programs (HDP) is a division of the U.S. National Park Service (NPS) responsible for administering the Historic American Buildings Survey (HABS), Historic American Engineering Record (HAER), and Historic American Landscapes Survey (HALS). These programs were established to document historic places in the United States. Records consist of measured drawings, archival photographs, and written reports, and are archived in the Prints and Photographs Division of the Library of Congress.

Historic American Buildings Survey 

In 1933, NPS established the Historic American Buildings Survey following a proposal by Charles E. Peterson, a young landscape architect in the agency. It was founded as a constructive make-work program for architects, draftsmen and photographers left jobless by the Great Depression. It was supported through the Historic Sites Act of 1935.

Guided by field instructions from Washington, D.C., the first HABS recorders were tasked with documenting a representative sampling of America's architectural heritage.
They began to document America's built environment, carrying out multi-format surveys that amassed a "more than 581,000 measured drawings, large-format photographs, written histories, and original field notes for more than 43,000 historic structures and sites dating from Pre-Columbian times to the twentieth century." 
By creating an archive of historic architecture, HABS provided a database of primary source material and documentation for the then-fledgling historic preservation movement.

Earlier private projects included Eleanor Raymond's Early Domestic Architecture of Pennsylvania (1931), Charles Morse Stotz's Western Pennsylvania Architectural Survey and the White Pine Series of Architectural Monographs. Many of their contributors later joined the HABS program.

Important HABS photographers include Jack Boucher, who worked for the project for over 40 years;
Robert W. Tebbs in New Orleans,
Louis and Ida Schwartz in Charleston, South Carolina,
James Butters in Mississippi, 
Richard J. Levy in Los Angeles. and 
Jet Lowe.

Historic American Engineering Record 

The Historic American Engineering Record (HAER) program was founded on January 10, 1969, by NPS and the American Society of Civil Engineers. HAER documents historic sites, structures, mechanical, and engineering artifacts. The Maritime Administration works with HAER to "document historic vessels prior to their disposal."

Since the advent of HAER, the combined program is typically called "HABS/HAER". Eric DeLony headed HAER from 1987 to 2003.

Historic American Landscapes Survey 

In October 2000, NPS and the American Society of Landscape Architects established a sister program, the Historic American Landscapes Survey, to systematically document historic American landscapes. A predecessor, the Historic American Landscape and Garden Project, recorded historic Massachusetts gardens between 1935 and 1940. That project was funded by the Works Progress Administration, but was administered by HABS, which supervised the collection of records.

In 2001, along with the Library of Congress, the NPS, and the American Society of Landscape Architects signed a Memorandum of Understanding which established a working relationship between the three organizations. Following the signing of this agreement, these organizations together signed the Tripartite Agreement in 2010, making "HALS a permanent federal program."

The NPS deals with the planning and operations of HALS, standardizes the formats and develops the guidelines for recording landscapes.

Library of Congress 
The permanent collection of HABS/HAER/HALS are housed at the Library of Congress, which was established in 1790 (and reestablished after the disastrous fire of 1814 in Washington, D.C. by purchasing former third President Thomas Jefferson's personal library at Monticello in 1815) as the replacement reference library of the United States Congress. It has since been expanded to serve as the national library of the United States; U.S. publishers are required to deposit a copy of every copyrighted and published work, book monograph and magazine. As a branch of the United States Government, its created works are in the public domain in the US. Many images, drawings, and documents are available through the Prints and Photographs Online Catalog, including proposed, demolished, and existing structures; locales, projects, and designs.

See also
Jack Boucher, former HABS/HAER photographer
Eric DeLony, former chief of HAER
Jet Lowe, former HAER photographer
National Register of Historic Places

References

External links 

 Records of the Historic American Buildings Survey (HABS)/Historic American Engineering Record (HAER) Division Guide to Federal Records
 National Park Service (NPS): official Heritage Documentation Programs website
 Library of Congress HABS/HAER/HALS Collection
 Photographer Stepen Schafer BLOG: Frequently Asked Questions about HABS, HAER and HALS website
 New England based Photographer Andrew Baugnet specializes in HABS/HAER photographic documentation
 Historic American Buildings Survey (HABS) Collection at the University of Maryland Libraries

 

Photo archives in the United States
Online archives of the United States
Architecture organizations based in the United States
History of engineering
.
National Park Service
Works Progress Administration
1933 establishments in the United States